The 2015–16 Drexel Dragons women's basketball team represent Drexel University during the 2015–16 NCAA Division I women's basketball season. The Dragons, led by thirteenth year head coach Denise Dillon, play their home games at the Daskalakis Athletic Center and were members of the Colonial Athletic Association.

They finished the season 19–14, 13–5 in CAA play to finish in second place. They advanced to the championship game of the CAA women's tournament where they lost to James Madison. They were invited to the Women's National Invitational Tournament where they lost to Temple in the first round.

Roster

Schedule

|-
!colspan=12 style="background:#FFC600; color:#07294D;"| Exhibition

|-
!colspan=12 style="background:#FFC600; color:#07294D;"| Non-conference regular season
|-

|-
!colspan=12 style="background:#FFC600; color:#07294D;"| CAA regular season

|-
!colspan=12 style="background:#FFC600; color:#07294D;"| CAA Tournament

|-
!colspan=12 style="background:#FFC600; color:#07294D;"| WNIT

See also
2015–16 Drexel Dragons men's basketball team

References

Drexel Dragons women's basketball seasons
Drexel
2016 Women's National Invitation Tournament participants